Wien Meidling may refer to:
 Meidling, the 12th district of Vienna
 Wien Meidling railway station, one of Vienna's main railway stations located at the Philadelphiabrücke.